Hellenic Spirit is a Greek ferry operated and owned by ANEK Lines. The ship was completed in 2001 at Fosen Mek Verksteder A/S, Norway. It travels from Ancona, Italy, to Patras, Greece, with a stop in  Igoumenitsa, Greece.''''''''''.

References

2000 ships
Ferries of Greece